The 11th BRDC International Trophy was a motor race, run to Formula One rules, held on 2 May 1959 at the Silverstone Circuit, England. The race was run over 50 laps of the Grand Prix circuit, and was won by Australian driver Jack Brabham in a Cooper T51.

The race marked the debut of Aston Martin's entry into Formula One motor racing. Both cars performed well, placing third and sixth in practice, and Roy Salvadori achieved fastest lap on his way to second place. However, their performance flattered to deceive, and they were never as competitive again.

The field also included several Formula Two cars, highest finisher being Jim Russell in a Cooper T45.

Results 
''Note: a blue background indicates a car running under Formula 2 regulations.

References 

BRDC International Trophy
BRDC International Trophy
BRDC
BRDC International Trophy